Baker Beach is a public beach on the peninsula of San Francisco, California, U.S. The beach lies on the shore of the Pacific Ocean in the northwest of the city. The northern section of Baker Beach is "frequented by clothing-optional sunbathers," and as such it is considered a nude beach.

The  property was settled by John Henry Baker in the 1850s and was known as Golden Gate Milk Ranch.

Baker died in 1863 and his widow, Maria, lost the property to foreclosure in 1879. In 1897, Baker's grandson, Fairfax Henry Wheelan sued  to have the title returned to the heirs of John H. Baker citing the claim that Baker's widow did not have the legal power to mortgage the property.

History

Baker Beach is part of the Presidio, which was a military base from the founding of San Francisco by the Spanish in 1812 until 1997. 
In 1904, it was fortified with disappearing gun installations known as Battery Chamberlin, which can still be viewed today.
When the Presidio was decommissioned as a U.S. Army base, it became part of the Golden Gate National Recreation Area, which is administered by the National Park Service.

From 1986 to 1990, the north end of Baker Beach was the original site of the Burning Man art festival. In 1990, park police allowed participants to raise the traditional large statue but not to set it on fire, since the beach enforces a limit on the size of any campfires. Subsequent Burning Man events have taken place in Black Rock Desert, Nevada.

This was the only shark attack recorded on Baker Beach.

Large outcrops of serpentine cliffs occur along the Pacific coast near Baker Beach. When rising from the land surface, serpentine produces a low-calcium, high-magnesium soil that can allow for rare species of plants to develop in the vicinity. This may explain the presence of Hesperolinon congestum (the Marin Dwarf Flax, a threatened plant) in surrounding areas.

To the north of the beach is Marshall's Beach and was the site of a Japanese Type 93 torpedo imbedded in the beach sand in 1946. Historian Mark Felton believes it was fired by Japanese submarine I-15 in 1941, which was sailing near the waters off San Francisco.

See also
List of beaches in California
List of California state parks

References

External links

Golden Gate National Recreation Area
San Francisco Bay Area beaches
Nude beaches
Beaches of San Francisco
Presidio of San Francisco
Parks in San Francisco